Dominique Desanti (1920 – April 8, 2011) was a French journalist, novelist, educator and biographer.

The daughter of a Russian immigrant, she was born Dominique Persky in Paris. She served in the French Resistance during the German occupation. She was a member of the French Communist Party from 1943 until 1956. Desanti was a correspondent for L'Humanité in the years following World War II. She also taught university in the United States.

Desanti was married to the philosopher Jean-Toussaint Desanti; he died in 2002.

She died in Paris in 2011.

Selected works

Biographies 
 Flora Tristan : La Femme révoltée (1972)
 Drieu La Rochelle (1978)
 Sacha Guitry (1982) Prix Thérouanne from l'Académie française
 Sonia Delaunay (1988)
 Ce que le siècle m'a dit. Mémoires (1997), autobiography
 Robert Desnos: Le roman d'une vie (1999)
 La liberté nous aime encore (2001) with Jean-Toussaint Desanti
 La Sainte et l'Incroyante (2007)
 Sacha Guitry, itinéraire d'un joueur (2008) with Karin Müller
 Les Yeux d'Elsa au siècle d'Aragon (2010) with Karin Müller

History 
 La colombe vole sans visa (1951)
 Les Socialistes de l’Utopie (1971) Prix Thérouanne from l'Académie française
 Les Staliniens (1975)

Novels 
 Un métier de chien (1971)
 Les Années passion (1992)

References 

Writers from Paris
1920 births
2011 deaths
French women journalists
French women novelists
French biographers
Women biographers
20th-century French novelists
20th-century French women writers
20th-century biographers
Female resistance members of World War II
Communist members of the French Resistance
French women in World War II
French women historians
Signatories of the 1971 Manifesto of the 343